The Wolfpack is a 2015 American documentary film, directed by Crystal Moselle. It is about the Angulo family, who homeschooled and raised their seven children (six boys and one girl) in the confinement of their apartment in the Lower East Side of New York City. The film premiered on January 25, 2015 at the Sundance Film Festival, where it won the U.S. Documentary Grand Jury Prize.

Synopsis
Locked away in an apartment in the Lower East Side of Manhattan for fourteen years, the Angulo family's seven children — Visnu, their only daughter, and her six brothers: Bhagavan (b. 1991/1992), twins Narayana (who now goes by Josef) and Govinda (b. 1993/1994), Mukunda (b. 1995/1996), Krisna (who now goes by Glenn, b. 1997/1998), and Jagadesh (who now goes by Eddie, b. 1998/1999) — learned about the world through watching films. They also re-enact scenes from their favorite movies. They were homeschooled by their mother and confined to their sixteenth story four-bedroom apartment in the Seward Park Extension housing project. Their father, Oscar, had the only door key and prohibited the kids and their mother Susanne from leaving the apartment except for a few strictly monitored trips on the "nefarious" streets.

Everything changed for them when 15-year-old Mukunda decided to walk around the neighborhood in January 2010, against their father's instruction to remain inside. All the brothers then decided to begin exploring Manhattan and the world outside.

Production
In 2010, Crystal Moselle, then a graduate of New York's School of Visual Arts, chanced upon a striking group of six siblings while walking down First Avenue in Manhattan. The six male siblings, who were then between 11 and 18 years old, wore black Ray-Ban sunglasses reminiscent of Reservoir Dogs and had waist-long hair. Moselle became friends with them and later found out that they had been confined to their Manhattan apartment for 14 years; that they had learned about the world by watching movies; and that most, if not all, social situations were new to them. They bonded quickly with Moselle because of their shared love of films.

The Tribeca Film Institute provided financial support and assistance to the film director. Magnolia Pictures bought worldwide rights to the documentary.

The film had its London premiere on August 21, 2015.

Reception

, review aggregator Rotten Tomatoes reports that 85% of 125 film critics have given the film a positive review, with a rating average of 7.1 out of 10. The site's summary states: "Offering a unique look at modern fears and our fascination with film, The Wolfpack is a fascinating—and ultimately haunting—urban fable." , on Metacritic the film has a score of 74 out of 100, based on 25 critics, indicating "generally favorable reviews".

Jordan Hoffman of The Guardian gave the film a five-star review and compared it to Grey Gardens, saying, "Not since Grey Gardens has a film invited us into such a strange, barely-functioning home and allowed us to gawk without reservation." Scott Foundas of Variety also gave the film a positive review: "There is much to enjoy in director Crystal Moselle's debut documentary feature, which if nothing else begs a where-are-they-now sequel a few years down the road." Jordan Raup of The Film Stage in his review said that "The Wolfpack is an endlessly fascinating documentary, but it’s not quite a great one." Eric Kohn in his review for Indiewire graded the film B+ and said that "Crystal Moselle's portrait of teens trapped in an apartment for most of their lives is filled with compelling mysteries."

However, John DeFore of The Hollywood Reporter criticized the film, saying, "This debut doc doesn't quite make the most of fascinating and likeable subjects." Kate Erbland of The Playlist said that 'The Wolfpack' is a film about access, and though we are admitted into the world of the eponymous Wolfpack, not understanding how we got there robs the film of compelling commentary." Paul Byrne, while conceding that Wolfpack is 'a confronting and confounding true story', writes; "Some of the boys were barely teenagers when Moselle started to film, too young to give consent. The sister is mentally handicapped, so incapable of consent. The father might be mentally ill – another problem of consent...The question then becomes how much [Moselle's] presence changes what we see." Steve Thomas of The Conversation points to "ethical questions surrounding The Wolfpack", saying; "truth is that whilst filmmakers can cite signed release forms to justify their actions, these are just pieces of paper. Consent in longitudinal documentary projects (which follow people over a long period of time) is an ongoing process."

The story was covered in the June 19, 2015, episode of ABC 20/20.

The film was the Closing Night film of Maryland Film Festival 2015.

Accolades

References

External links
 
 
  
 

2015 documentary films
American documentary films
Documentary films about education in the United States
Documentary films about New York City
Films about siblings
Films set in Manhattan
Sundance Film Festival award winners
2015 independent films
Works about homeschooling and unschooling
2010s English-language films
2010s American films